Saint Edward's Chapel in Eau Claire, Wisconsin was constructed in 1889–1896 in the Gothic Revival style. It was added to the National Register of Historic Places for its religious significance in 2000.

The chapel closed for worship in 1918 and became a private house. The building is now a Montessori preschool.

References

Properties of religious function on the National Register of Historic Places in Wisconsin
Chapels in the United States
Buildings and structures in Eau Claire, Wisconsin
Gothic Revival church buildings in Wisconsin
National Register of Historic Places in Eau Claire County, Wisconsin